Caushaud Lyons (born January 3, 1993) is a former American football defensive end. He played college football at Tusculum.

Professional career

Tampa Bay Buccaneers
Lyons was signed by the Buccaneers as an undrafted free agent on May 5, 2015. He was waived on September 5, 2015.

Pittsburgh Steelers
Lyons was claimed off waivers by the Pittsburgh Steelers on September 6, 2015. He was released on September 30 and then re-signed to the practice squad on October 2. On January 19, Lyons signed a futures contract with the Pittsburgh Steelers.

On September 3, 2016, Lyons was released by the Steelers as part of final roster cuts. The next day he was signed to the Steelers' practice squad.

Tennessee Titans
On January 24, 2017, Lyons signed a futures contract with the Titans. He was waived on June 13, 2017.

Los Angeles Rams
On July 28, 2017, Lyons was signed by the Los Angeles Rams. He was waived on August 22, 2017.

Detroit Lions
On August 23, 2017, Lyons was claimed off waivers by the Detroit Lions. He was waived on September 2, 2017.

Chicago Bears
On December 12, 2017, Lyons was signed to the Chicago Bears' practice squad.

Minnesota Vikings
On January 9, 2018, Lyons was signed to the Minnesota Vikings' practice squad. He signed a reserve/future contract with the Vikings on January 22, 2018. He was waived on May 7, 2018.

Denver Broncos (first stint)
On June 15, 2018, Lyons signed with the Denver Broncos. He was waived on September 1, 2018.

Washington Redskins
Lyons signed with the Washington Redskins' practice squad on September 3, 2018, but was waived the following day.

Denver Broncos (second stint)
On November 27, 2018, Lyons was signed to the Denver Broncos practice squad. On January, 2, 2019, Lyons was re-signed to reserve/future contract. He was waived on May 13, 2019.

Houston Roughnecks
Lyons was drafted in the 9th round during phase three in the 2020 XFL Draft by the Houston Roughnecks. He had his contract terminated when the league suspended operations on April 10, 2020.

References

External links
Tampa Bay Buccaneers bio

1993 births
Living people
American football defensive ends
American football defensive tackles
Chicago Bears players
Denver Broncos players
Detroit Lions players
Houston Roughnecks players
Los Angeles Rams players
Minnesota Vikings players
Pittsburgh Steelers players
Players of American football from Atlanta
Tampa Bay Buccaneers players
Tennessee Titans players
Tusculum Pioneers football players
Washington Redskins players